Aesthetic distance refers to the gap between a viewer's conscious reality and the fictional reality presented in a work of art.  When a reader becomes fully engrossed in the illusory narrative world of a book, the author has achieved a close aesthetic distance.  If the author then jars the reader from the reality of the story, essentially reminding the reader they are reading a book, the author is said to have "violated the aesthetic distance."

Overview
The concept originates from Immanuel Kant's Critique of Judgement, where he establishes the notion of disinterested delight which does not depend on the subject's having a desire for the object itself, he writes, "delight in beautiful art does not, in the pure judgement of taste, involve an immediate interest. [...] it is not the object that is of immediate interest, but rather the inherent character of the beauty qualifying it for such a partnership-a character, therefore, that belongs to the very essence of beauty."

The term aesthetic distance itself derives from an article by Edward Bullough published in 1912. In that article, he begins with the image of a passenger on a ship observing fog at sea. If the passenger thinks of the fog in terms of danger to the ship, the experience is not aesthetic, but to regard the beautiful scene in detached wonder is to take legitimate aesthetic attitude. One must feel, but not too much. Bullough writes, "Distance … is obtained by separating the object and its appeal from one's own self, by putting it out of gear with practical needs and ends. Thereby the 'contemplation' of the object becomes alone possible."

Authors of film, fiction, drama, and poetry evoke different levels of aesthetic distance.  For instance, William Faulkner tends to invoke a close aesthetic distance by using first-person narrative and stream of consciousness, while Ernest Hemingway tends to invoke a greater aesthetic distance from the reader through use of third person narrative.

Violating the aesthetic distance

Anything that pulls a viewer out of the reality of a work of fiction is said to be a violation of aesthetic distance.  An easy example in theater or film is "breaking the fourth wall," when characters suspend the progress of the story to speak directly to the audience.  When the aesthetic distance is deliberately violated in theater, it is known as the distancing effect, or Verfremdungseffekt, a concept coined by playwright Bertolt Brecht.

Many examples of violating the aesthetic distance may also be found in meta-fiction.  William Goldman, in The Princess Bride, repeatedly interrupts his own fairy tale to speak directly to the reader. In the musical, Stop the World I Want to Get Off, the protagonist, Littlechap, periodically stops the progress of the play to address the audience directly.

In film, the aesthetic distance is often violated unintentionally.  Examples might include a director's cameo, poor special effects, or perhaps blatant product placement - any can be enough to pull a viewer out of the reality of the film.  David Mamet in On Directing Film asserts that any direct depiction of graphic sex or violence in film is an inherent violation of aesthetic distance, as audience members will instinctively make judgments as to whether or not what they just saw was real, and thus be pulled out of the story-telling.

See also

Distancing effect
Suspension of disbelief
Fourth wall

References

Concepts in film theory
Metafictional techniques
Cinematic techniques
Narrative techniques